Agí Donáth (25 March 1918 – 16 February 2008) was a Hungarian-born American child actress, who appeared in a dozen or so films during the 1930s, most notably, Sister Maria.

She was born on 25 March 1918 in Budapest, Austria-Hungary. On 24 June 1938 she married producer Emeric Pressburger. The union lasted until 1941. After the divorce, she emigrated to the United States. She remarried and became a successful businesswoman and real estate broker in Bel Air and a socialite.

Selected filmography
 Modern Girls (1937)
 I defended a woman (1938)

Death
She died on 16 February 2008, aged 89, in Palm Desert, California.

External links
IMDb bio

1918 births
2008 deaths
Hungarian film actresses
Hungarian emigrants to the United States
20th-century American businesspeople
American socialites
People from Palm Desert, California
Actresses from Budapest